Jacob Mar Theophilos (21 February 1891 in Olassa, Kottayam, Kerala – 27 June 1956 in Tiruvalla, Kerala) was the co-builder of the Reunion Movement and the first bishop of Eparchy of Tiruvalla of the Syro-Malankara Catholic Church.

Early life
Jacob (Yakob) Mar Theophilos was born as the first son of Abraham Tharakan and Achama of Kulapurackalveedu. After primary education from a nearby school, he completed matriculation from MD High School, Kottayam, where he later became a teacher. He longed to lead a life of priesthood by his own religious tradition and by the inspiration of MA Achan (Fr. P. T. Geevarghese Panikerveettil, later Archbishop Mar Ivanios), who was then Principal of the MD High School. Mar Theophilos received his sacred order of the Diconate from Metropolitan Vattasseril Mar Divannasios. MA Achan took Mar Theophilos, his deacon, to Serampore when he (MA Achan) took up an assignment as Professor of the Serampore University.

In Bethany Ashram
Deacon Yakob stood with Archbishop Mar Ivanios in the founding of Bethany Ashram and later in embracing the Catholic Communion through the Re-union Movement.  One of the first members of the Bethany Congregation was Fr. Yakob.  He was the Guru(Master) of the Novices. He was ordained priest in 1924 and was elected and ordained Bishop after the name Yakob Mar Theophilos.

Ecclesial Communion Movement
Mar Theophilos gave full support to Mar Ivanios in all his pioneering endeavours especially of the Reunion Movement. Though other Bishops backtracked from the decision of the Synod of Parumala held in 1926, Mar Theophilos endorsed it with full conviction and commitment. Thus he became one among the first five members of the Re-union Movement on 20 September 1930.

Bishop of Tiruvalla
When the Syro-Malankara Catholic Hierarchy was established in 1932, he was appointed the first Metropolitan of Tiruvalla. His Aramana (Bishop's residence) was a small two storied building named Cherupushpagiri, situated in the place where now stands the Pushpagiri Medical College. In 1933 Mar Theophilos visited Rome and paid his respects to Pope Pius XI. 

Jacob Mar Theophilos blessed the new Bishop’s house on 24 November 1934. Many churches, schools, Infant Mary Minor Seminary (the first seminary in the syro malankara catholic church) and the St. Joseph’s press were started by him. With the mission to spread the faith and to strengthen the Re-union Movement, he formed "Sakshyasangam" ("Group of Witnesses").

Death
Due to ill health, he handed over the administration of the Eparchy to Mar Severios and took rest. Mar Theophilos died on 27 June 1956, aged 65. His remains are entombed in St. John's Cathedral, Tiruvalla.

External links
Syro-Malankara Catholic Church

Converts to Eastern Catholicism from Oriental Orthodoxy
20th-century Eastern Catholic bishops
Saint Thomas Christians
Syro-Malankara bishops
Christian clergy from Kottayam
1891 births
1956 deaths